Tajsar is a village in Fatehpur tehsil of Sikar district in Rajasthan, India.

Villages in Sikar district